The Elephant is White is a 1939 comedy novel by Caryl Brahms and S.J. Simon, a regular writing team between 1937 and 1950. In prewar Paris an idle Englishman runs into a group of eccentric Russian exiles in a nightclub.

Film adaptation
In 1944 it was adapted into the film Give Us the Moon directed by Val Guest and starring Margaret Lockwood, Vic Oliver and Roland Culver. The film updated the plot into a future postwar era.

References

Bibliography
 Goble, Alan. The Complete Index to Literary Sources in Film. Walter de Gruyter, 1999.

1939 British novels
Novels set in Paris
British novels adapted into films
British comedy novels
Michael Joseph books